Tamara Glynn (born December 6, 1968) is an American actress. She began her career as a teenager in the late 1980s, appearing in television shows such as Miami Vice and Growing Pains before becoming known for her horror roles as Samantha Thomas in the slasher film Halloween 5: The Revenge of Michael Myers (1989), Laura in an episode of the anthology series Freddy's Nightmares (1989), and a cameo role as a mother in the slasher film Terrifier 2 (2022)—featuring horror icons Michael Myers of the Halloween franchise, Freddy Krueger of the A Nightmare on Elm Street franchise, and Art the Clown of the Terrifier franchise.

Career
Glynn made her television debut in 1987 on the short-lived NBC musical, Rags to Riches. The following year, she guest-starred as Susan Fryman on the ABC sitcom Growing Pains. She also appeared in the Don Johnson-produced television film, Life on the Flipside.

Glynn first became associated with the horror genre when she guest-starred on an episode of Freddy's Nightmares, the series based on the Nightmare on Elm Street franchise. She appears as Laura in the episode "Love Stinks", directed by John Lafia and co-starring Jeffrey Combs. She also appeared on the daytime soap opera Knots Landing, as well as the series finale of the hit crime drama Miami Vice. The episode, "Freefall", was broadcast on May 21, 1989 and drew in 22.2 million viewers, becoming the 6th highest-rated series finale program at that time. As of 2014, the episode ranks 23rd all-time.

At the age of 20, she auditioned and won the role of Samantha in Halloween 5: The Revenge of Michael Myers. Halloween 5 was released in the United States on October 13, 1989, opening at #2 at the box office (behind Look Who's Talking) taking in $5,093,428, ultimately grossing $11,642,254 during its initial theater run. The film received generally negative reviews. The following year, she appeared in the final episode of the short-lived Disney/NBC series, A Brand New Life. In 1991, she guest-starred as Nikki Phillips in an episode of the action-adventure sci-fi series Super Force.

In 1998, she filmed a role in Daddy and Them, a dark comedy about a dysfunctional Arkansas family, starring, written, and directed by Billy Bob Thornton. She stars as a paramedic who attends to Thornton after a car crash, igniting the jealousy of his wife (Laura Dern). The film also features Diane Ladd, Ben Affleck, Andy Griffith, Jamie Lee Curtis and Jim Varney in his final performance. Daddy and Them premiered at the 2001 Newport International Film Festival to fairly positive reviews. It placed fourth among the audience favorites at the Nashville Film Festival and later screened at the Montreal World Film Festival. A theatrical release was originally planned, however, after being shelved numerous times, the film premiered on the Showtime network on July 10, 2003, to generally positive reviews.

As of 2014, she stars in Blu de Golyer's Hillbilly Horror Show, a Vimeo-on-Demand anthology showcasing various independent horror shorts. She recently signed on to star as Morgan Leads in Spencer Gray's The Border.

Personal life
Glynn was born and raised in Hot Springs, Arkansas. Her mother, Donna Dodson (1942-2013), was an executive assistant on the 1989 television film, L.A. Takedown. She is the hostess and co-founder of the Hot Springs Horror Film Festival.

The first annual event was held at the Hot Springs Central Theatre in September 2013, and featured guests such as Tyler Mane, Renae Geerlings, Eileen Dietz, David Schmoeller, and Jeff Burr. "If one filmmaker can take away one ounce of information from this festival and incorporate that into their next project, for me, that is success."

Filmography

References

External links
 
 Hot Springs Horror Film Festival website

1968 births
Actresses from Arkansas
American film actresses
American television actresses
Living people
Actors from Hot Springs, Arkansas
21st-century American women